Spiderman of the Rings is the first studio album by the American electronic musician Dan Deacon, released by Carpark Records on May 8, 2007. The album was released on white vinyl by Wildfire Wildfire Records.

Track listing
 "Wooody Wooodpecker" — 3:50
 "The Crystal Cat" — 3:53
 "Wham City" — 11:45
 "Big Milk" — 4:25
 "Okie Dokie" — 2:37
 "Trippy Green Skull" — 4:00
 "Snake Mistakes" — 4:11
 "Pink Batman" — 5:04
 "Jimmy Joe Roche" — 5:58

Reception
The single from this album, "The Crystal Cat," was #84 on Rolling Stone's list of the 100 Best Songs of 2007, and "Wham City" was #30 on Pitchfork's "Top 100 Tracks of 2007."

Personnel
Musicians
 Dan Deacon – Primary Artist
 Adam Endres – Vocals
 Dina Kelberman – Vocals 
 Connor Kizer – Vocals
 Ed Schrader – Vocals

Production
 OCDJ – Producer 
 Kevin O’Meara – Production Assistant

References

2007 albums
Dan Deacon albums
Carpark Records albums
Electronic albums by American artists